The name Caroni may refer to:

Caroní River, one of the biggest rivers of the Orinoco basin in Venezuela
Caroni River (Trinidad and Tobago), a major river on the island of Trinidad and Tobago
Caroni Swamp, a major wetland on the west coast of the island of Trinidad
Caroni Plain, plain in central Trinidad
Caroni County, Trinidad and Tobago, formerly a major administrative division in Trinidad and Tobago
Caroni Village, Trinidad and Tobago, a present-day village within the former Caroni County
Caroni (1975) Ltd., a former sugar producing company in Trinidad and Tobago